Osmia albolateralis is a species of bee that lives across the US. Mainly in the east, but also in British Columbia. Alberta. and Quebec it belongs to the genus Osmia and the family Megachilidae. It was described by Cockerell in 1906.

References

Insects of North America
albolateralis